The  was a multi-purpose public cultural facility in Akita, Japan, which operated from 30 April 1961 to 31 May 2018. The main concert hall had a seating capacity of 1,839. Notable past performers include Rainbow.

Events at Akita Kenmin Kaikan
Santana 26 November 1974
Quincy Jones 10 April 1975
Three Dog Night 6 May1975
Keith Jarrett 4 June 1975
Suzi Quatro 7 July 1976
Santana 22 November 1977
Rainbow 29 January 1978
Cheap Trick 26 March 1979
Yellow Magic Orchestra 1 April 1980
The Nolans 1980
The Crusaders
Chick Corea 2 November 1982
Gary Moore 15 October 1985
The Ventures 10 September 1992
C.J. Lewis 1995
Cyndi Lauper 26 November 1996
Bob Dylan 22 February 1997
Whitesnake 19 September 1997
Bob Dylan 28 February 2001
Alanis Morissette 2 October 2002
Mr. Big 19 April 2011
Téada 8 April 2014

See also
Akita City Culture Hall

References

Concert halls in Japan
Former buildings and structures in Japan
Buildings and structures in Akita (city)